Truong Ba's soul in butcher's body (Vietnemese original title: Hồn Trương Ba, da hàng thịt) is a 2006 romantic comedy film directed by Quang Dung Nguyen and starring Johnny Tri Nguyen and Phuoc Sang. It is based on a traditional Vietnamese tale Trương Ba's Soul in the Butcher's Body that has inspired many comedies, musicals and novels.

Cast

External links 
 

2006 films
Vietnamese-language films
Vietnamese parody films
2006 romantic comedy films
Vietnamese romantic comedy films